Balls of Steel is the eighth Bravo stand-up comedy special by stand-up comedian Kathy Griffin, and her tenth overall.

Track listing

Personnel

Technical and production
Cori Abraham - executive producer
Andy Cohen - executive producer
Kathy Griffin - executive producer
Jenn Levy - executive producer
Paul Miller - executive producer
Kimber Rickabaugh - executive producer
David W. Foster - film editor
Bruce Ryan - production design
Deborah Adamson - production manager
Cisco Henson - executive in charge of production
Lesley Maynard - production supervisor
Gene Crowe - associate director, stage manager

Visuals and imagery
Adam Christopher - makeup artist
Giovanni Giuliano - hair
Jason Dutcher - camera operator
Darin Haggard - camera operator
Simon Miles - lighting designer
Lee Shull - camera operator
David Neal Stewart - camera operator

Award and nominations
The live Bravo performance special was nominated for the Emmy for Outstanding Picture Editing For A Special (Single Or Multi-Camera) in the 62nd Primetime Emmy Awards.

References

External links
Kathy Griffin's Official Website

Kathy Griffin albums
Stand-up comedy albums
2009 live albums
Shout! Factory live albums
Live comedy albums
Spoken word albums by American artists
Live spoken word albums
2000s comedy albums